Bruce William Biddle (born 2 November 1948 in Warkworth) is a former road racing cyclist from New Zealand, who was a professional rider from 1974 to 1979. He won the gold medal in the men's individual road race at the 1970 Commonwealth Games in Edinburgh, Scotland.

He represented his native country at the 1972 Summer Olympics in Munich, West Germany, where he came fourth in the men's individual road race. Although Jaime Huelamo from Spain, who came third, was disqualified for failing a drug test, the bronze medal was not awarded to Biddle as he had not been tested for drugs.

Career highlights

1969
 National Road Race Champion
 1st Overall Dulux Tour of the North Island
1970
 1st Commonwealth Games Road Race
1971
 2nd, Stage 11 Milk Race, Bognor Regis (GBR)
1972
 4th, Olympic Road Race
1974
 3rd, Giro del Lazio (ITA)
1976
 3rd, Stage 5 part b Tirreno - Adriatico (ITA)
 2nd, Stage 7 Tour de Suisse, Lausanne (SUI)
 2nd, Stage 8 Tour de Suisse, Solothurn (SUI)
 2nd, Möhlin (SUI)
1978
 34th, GC Giro d'Italia (ITA)

References

External links
 Profile New Zealand Olympic Committee
 NZ Herald
 

1949 births
Living people
New Zealand male cyclists
Cyclists at the 1972 Summer Olympics
Olympic cyclists of New Zealand
Cyclists at the 1970 British Commonwealth Games
Commonwealth Games gold medallists for New Zealand
Cyclists from Auckland
People from Warkworth, New Zealand
Commonwealth Games medallists in cycling
20th-century New Zealand people
Medallists at the 1970 British Commonwealth Games